The Cementerio General de La Almudena is a cemetery in Santiago District, Cuzco, Peru. In the 19th century, there was also a mental hospital and a prison in this area.

Since 2010 the property was declared by the Ministry of Culture as Cultural heritage of Peru. Also, in 1983, being part of the historic centre of the city of Cuzco, it is part of the central area declared by UNESCO as a World Heritage Site.

History
The cemetery was built between 1846 and 1850 during the government of Ramón Castilla, who had ordered the construction of a cemetery in the city of Cuzco for health reasons since until then, and since the colony, burials were carried out in the cellars of the city's churches. The prefect of the city, José Medina, chose the area where the colonial hospital of the Bethlehemites and the Templo de la Almudena stood, which were far from the center of the city. Next to these buildings there was a small colonial cemetery that was already used as a cemetery for said hospital.

Opposite the Plazoleta de la Almudena stands the stone façade of the cemetery. This presents Greek columns that correspond to a representation of neoclassical architecture. The entrance shows a semicircular arch with protruding imposts at the start of the arch, flanked by a double column with a Corinthian capital. At the top of the narthex rises a semicircular dome. The frontispiece of the cemetery also has windows and portals on both sides that overlook other rooms that served as a wake and morgue. It is also pointed out that these walls were used during the 19th century by firing squads.

In the east wing of the cemetery are the oldest mausoleums. The oldest dates from 1857 and the identity of the deceased is unknown because the inscriptions have already been erased by time. In this mausoleum there are traces of black candles due to their use in magical-religious rites and practices of witchcraft and satanism. Close to this is the Cruz Mayor, common in ancient cemeteries in Peru. In this cemetery, the cross is carved and is used so that those who cannot find the place where their loved one is buried can leave their offerings and prayers on it. Among the mausoleums, the one that corresponds to the Mendivil family stands out, whose ornaments are representations of the wise men and musketeer angels in the typical form of Mendívil crafts, with elongated necks and tiny frames. In the same sector is the Central Chapel of Santo Roma, which is a construction prior to the same cemetery and which is behind the Temple of the Almudena. It was built on January 27, 1802, by Bishop . Initially, this chapel housed the funeral rites of the cemetery. At present it is used as an incinerator for bodies.

Finally, also in the eastern sector, there is the exit to the cemetery that was formerly used by people with fewer resources and that, since 2001, was modified for the construction of modern mausoleums and new pavilions. A characteristic of this cemetery that differentiates it from the rest of the country is the use of gold and silver metals in the tombstones, unlike the plaster or marble that is usual in the rest of Peru. Also, in the possibility that the tombstones can be decorated by the family with various miniatures, which shows a lot of the idiosyncrasy of each family.

References

Buildings and structures in Cusco
Cemeteries in Peru